Eucalyptus glomericassis, commonly known as scarp white gum, is a species of small tree that is endemic to the Northern Territory. It has smooth bark, lance-shaped to curved adult leaves, flower buds in groups of seven, white flowers and conical fruit.

Description
It has smooth white or grey bark that is shed to reveal pale pink to pale orange new bark. Flowering has been recorded in January and the flowers are white.

Taxonomy and naming
Eucalyptus glomericassis was first formally described in 2000 by Lawrie Johnson and Ken Hill in the journal Telopea. The type specimen was collected in 1977 from Deaf Adder Gorge by Clyde Dunlop. The specific epithet glomericassis is "from Latin glomus, glomeris a ball and cassis a helmet, referring to the shape of the calyptra".

Distribution and habitat
Scarp white gum grows near the edges of the sandstone plateau, often near watercourses, in Kakadu National Park and western Arnhem Land.

See also
List of Eucalyptus species

References

Trees of Australia
glomericassis
Myrtales of Australia
Flora of the Northern Territory
Plants described in 2000
Taxa named by Lawrence Alexander Sidney Johnson
Taxa named by Ken Hill (botanist)